The South American XV (sometimes known as CONSUR XV and formerly as South American Jaguars) is a rugby union team made up from the national rugby sides in the Sudamérica Rugby (formerly CONSUR) rugby federation. 

The squad was first formed in 1980 to compete against South African teams, despite the ban imposed on that country in repudiation of apartheid. Over the eight test matches played, seven of them were won by the Springboks and only one was won by the Jaguars. This single victory came at Bloemfontein in 1982.

In 2011, a new South America XV was formed to face the Argentine side before they trip to New Zealand to play the 2011 Rugby World Cup.

History

First team: the 1980s 

The side was formed in 1980 after an invitation from the SARU to the Argentine Rugby Union (UAR) to play a series of games there as a way of counteracting its sporting isolation which was due to the country's apartheid policies.

The team that toured was mainly made up of Argentina players and included a few Uruguayan, Chilean, Paraguayan, Brazilian and even Spanish players. The team was named "Sudamérica XV", wearing a white jersey with blue, red and gold stripes. The badge included a puma, a condor, a lapwing and a jaguar, representing Argentina, Chile, Uruguay and Paraguay respectively. Rodolfo O'Reilly was appointed as coach.

The Jaguars was a 'shadow' Argentine national team, not officially recognised by the UAR as a stratagem to elude the prohibition of the Argentine government that since the early 1970s forbade any official relationship between any Argentine sport federation and South African and Rhodesian ones, due to the apartheid politics of those countries. This ostracism had started in 1971 when the Argentine government forbade the Pumas to play a match in Rhodesia during the tour in South Africa.

In March 1973, the Argentine government and the UAR had a great conflict: the government contested to UAR the permit given to San Isidro Club to visit South Africa, and forced the federal committee of UAR to resign. A new committee was elected on 24 April 1973. In November the government also forbade all visits to South Africa by any Argentine team and any visit of a South African team into Argentina. This ban remained until 1991.

The only victory of South America in a test match came in 1982, when they beat South Africa 21–12, with all points scored by captain Hugo Porta. It also became the first win of an Argentine side over South Africa so all the players on the field were from that country.

In 1984 the Argentine Government forced the UAR to forbid the use of any Argentine emblem by the players. As a result, the body decided not to send any representative to South Africa, declining the invitation. Nevertheless, the players accepted the invitation, being part of the South American Jaguars that toured that year. That tour was the last, with the Jaguars being dissolved.

Rebirth 

In 2011, the side played one match against Argentina, in San Juan as part of their 2011 Rugby World Cup warm-ups. Argentina won 75-15.

The team reassembled in 2013, and played England on 2 June 2013 at Estadio Charrúa in Montevideo as a warm-up match for the English before playing 2 tests against Argentina.

The team competed at the 2015 Urucup, with players from the Argentine Pladar Litoral plus three guests from Colombia, Paraguay and Venezuela.

In November 2018, South American XV toured Chile and Paraguay to play the respective national teams. In August 2019, the team played Uruguay.

Test results 
Summarised list of matches played by the South American side (only considered "tests" are included):

Notes

References 

International rugby union teams
Multinational rugby union teams
Rugby union and apartheid
Rugby union in South America